Dolichoderus mesosternalis is an extinct species of Eocene ant in the genus Dolichoderus. Described by William Morton Wheeler in 1915, a fossilised worker of the species was found in the Baltic amber.

References

†
Eocene insects
Prehistoric insects of Europe
Fossil taxa described in 1915
Fossil ant taxa